The Australian Capital Territory Emergency Services Agency (ACT ESA) was established by the Emergencies Act 2004 (ACT), which came into effect on 1 July 2004.  The mission of the ACT ESA is to protect and preserve life, property and the environment in the ACT.

The ACT Emergency Services Agency (ESA) is the ACT Government organisation charged with providing emergency management services to the Canberra community.

The ESA Mission is “We work together to care and protect through cohesive operations, collaborative management and a unified executive”.

The ESA workforce profile includes over 2500 full time and volunteer personnel.

Structure
The Commissioner, ESA reports to Director-General of the Justice & Community Safety Directorate (JACS), who is responsible to the Minister for Police and Emergency Services.  The ACT ESA comprises: four emergency service agencies and several support areas, including:  People and Culture, Governance and Logistics, Risk & Planning Services, Emergency Media and Broadcasting Services. The four operational agencies are:
ACT Ambulance Service
ACT Fire & Rescue
ACT Rural Fire Service
ACT State Emergency Service

Commissioners
2003–2006 Peter Dunn AO
2006–2009 Gregor Manson
2009 David Foot ASM (Acting)
2010–2013 Mark Crosweller AFSM
2013–2019 Dominic Lane AFSM
2019 Georgeina Whelan AM, CSC and Bar

Budget

History

1993–2004: Emergency Services Bureau
Prior to 1 July 2004, emergency services in the ACT were delivered by the Emergency Services Bureau, an agency of the ACT Department of Justice and Community Safety.

2004–2006: Emergency Services Authority
The Emergencies Act 2004 (ACT) established the ESA as a statutory authority.

2006–present: Emergency Services Agency
In the 2006–07 Australian Capital Territory budget, the ACT Government announced that the ESA would again be subsumed by the ACT Department of Justice and Community Safety, effective 1 July 2006.

See also
ACT Ambulance Service
Gregor Manson, former ESA Commissioner
Peter Dunn, former ESA Commissioner
ACT Fire & Rescue
Australasian Fire and Emergency Service Authorities Council

References

Emergencies Act 2004 (ACT)
ACT ESA Annual Report 2004/05
ACT ESA Annual Report 2005/06
 McLeod, Ron. 2003. Inquiry into the Operational Response to the January 2003 Bushfires in the ACT 
Doogan, Maria. 2006. The Canberra Firestorm – Inquests and Inquiry into Four Deaths and Four Fires between 8 and 18 January 2003.

External links
ACT Emergency Services Agency Website
ACT Justice and Community Safety Directorate Website
ACT Government Website

Emergency services in the Australian Capital Territory
Fire and rescue services of Australia
2004 establishments in Australia
Organisations based in Canberra